Brünnich is a surname. Notable people with the surname include:

Morten Thrane Brünnich (1737–1827), Danish zoologist and mineralogist
Johannes Christian Brunnich (1861–1933), Australian agricultural chemist

See also
Andreas Brünniche (1704-1769), Danish portrait painter